

Vincenzo Silvano Casulli, usually known as Silvano Casulli (25 August 1944 – 24 July 2018) was an Italian amateur astronomer and a discoverer of minor planets at his Vallemare di Borbona Observatory  in Lazio.

He is credited by the Minor Planet Center with the discovery of 192 minor planets. In 1985 he served on a team involved in using the Hubble Space Telescope in a study that focused on Transition Comets—UV Search for OH Emissions in Asteroids. He was the first amateur astronomer to obtain precise astronometric positions of minor planets using a CCD camera. He is a prolific discoverer of asteroids.

In 1997, the inner main-belt asteroid and member of the Flora family, 7132 Casulli, was named by astronomer Antonio Vagnozzi in his honor.

Discoveries

9121 Stefanovalentini 

On 24 February 1998, he discovered 9121 Stefanovalentini at the Italian Colleverde Observatory. It is a carbonaceous asteroid from the outer regions of the main-belt, approximately 30 kilometers in diameter. Casulli also obtained a light-curve from photometric observations and determined a period of 11.84 hours for the body's rotation. He named it in honour of amateur astronomer Stefano Valentini.

93061 Barbagallo 

Together with Italian astronomer Ermes Colombini and others, he co-discovered the asteroid 93061 Barbagallo on 23 September 2000. The group-discovery is credited to the discovering observatory, Osservatorio San Vittore, Bologna. The asteroid was named after Mariano Barbagallo, an Italian colleague and friend of Colombini.

List of discovered minor planets

References

External links 
 ASTEROIDE N. 7132, on the naming of asteroid 7132 Casulli, including image of Silvano Casulli
 Colleverde di Guidonia, Gruppo Astrofili Montagna Pistoiese

1944 births
2018 deaths
People from Putignano
20th-century Italian astronomers
Discoverers of asteroids

21st-century Italian astronomers